The following is a list (in alphabetical order) of major bands and musicians from Sheffield, a city with musical heritage of note in South Yorkshire, England

0–9
65daysofstatic

A

ABC
Ace
All Seeing I
Alvarez Kings
Arctic Monkeys
Ahmad Hussain
Denis Arnold
Artery
Acrobats of Desire
The Absolute

B
Babybird
Derek Bailey
Bal-Sagoth
Josephine Barstow
Bassomatic
William Sterndale Bennett
Dave Berry
Lisa Beznosiuk
The Black Dog
Blameless
Bring Me the Horizon
Bromheads Jacket

C
 
Cabaret Voltaire
Paul Carrack (Squeeze, Ace & Mike + The Mechanics)
Chakk
Clock DVA
Jarvis Cocker
Joe Cocker
Comsat Angels
Jamie Cook
The Crookes
Steve Clark

D
Dead Sons
Def Leppard
Reginald Dixon (World-famous theatre Organ player)
Drenge
The Dylans

F
Forgemasters - Bleep techno act composed of Robert Gordon, Winston Hazel and Sean Maher.
Graham Fellows
Future Loop Foundation

G
Margaret Gale
Mark Gasser
Peter Glossop
John Grainger
Ginger

H
Happy Clappers
Harrisons
Dave Hawley
Richard Hawley
Heaven 17
Matt Helders
Victoria Hogg
Hoggboy
The Human League
Hoyden

I
I Monster
I'm So Hollow
In The Nursery

K
Krush

L

The Last Shadow Puppets
Ann Lee
Letters and Colours
LFO
Little Glitches
Little Man Tate
Living in a Box
The Long Blondes
The Longpigs
The Lonely Hearts

M
Malevolence
Milburn
Moloko
Mongrel
Monkey Swallows the Universe

N
Nai Harvest

O
One Thousand Violins
Tony Oxley
Nick O'Malley

P
Pink Grease
Pulp

R
Ramases
Bernard Rands
Reverend And The Makers
The Reytons
Rogue State
Rolo Tomassi

S
Rohan de Saram
Self Esteem
John Shuttleworth (fictitious character)
Slow Club
Smokers Die Younger
Stoney
Lucy Spraggan
Sophie and the Giants
Speedy

T
Tapton Youth Brass Band
Pete Thomas
Thompson Twins
Toddla T
Alex Turner

V
Vandal
Vitamin Z

W
 
While She Sleeps
Warm Dust
Wavestar

See also
Bands and musicians from Yorkshire and North East England

References

External links
Sheffield Band
Uncommon People
Sheffield Music Archive

 
Musicians from Sheffield
Sheffield